The FM and TV Mast Gdańsk/Chwaszczyno (RTCN Gdańsk/Chwaszczyno) is a 317 metre tall guyed mast for FM and TV situated at Chwaszczyno, Kartuzy County, Pomeranian Voivodeship, Poland.

Transmitted Programmes
This mast is used for transmitting the following FM and TV programmes.

FM Radio

Digital Television MPEG-4

See also
 List of masts

References

External links
emi.emitel
RadioPolska • Obiekty nadawcze aktywne

Interactive DVB-T/DVB-T2 maps - Coverage map

Radio masts and towers in Poland
Kartuzy County
1980 establishments in Poland
Towers completed in 1980